The Rumpler C.IV was a German single-engine, two-seat reconnaissance biplane. It was a development of C.III with different tail surfaces and using a Mercedes D.IVa engine in place of the C.III's Benz Bz.IV. The Rumpler 6B 2   was a single-seat floatplane fighter variant with a 120 kW (160 hp) Mercedes D.III engine built for the Kaiserliche Marine (Imperial Navy).

For a two-seater reconnaissance aircraft, Rumpler C.IV had an excellent performance, which enabled it to remain in front-line service until the end of World War I on the Western Front, as well as in Italy and Palestine. Its exceptional ceiling allowed pilots to undertake reconnaissance secure in the knowledge that few allied aircraft could reach it.

300 aircraft were licence-built by Pfalz Flugzeugwerke as the Pfalz C.I, differing in ailerons on all four wings. From February 1917 they were renamed Rumpler C.IV (Pfal).

For use during filming, Slingsby Sailplanes built two Slingsby T.58 Rumpler C.IV replicas. While these were visually similar to the original aircraft, they were structurally completely different, having a steel-tube fuselage structure and wooden wings, and being powered by a de Havilland Gipsy Major engine.

Variants
Rumpler C.IV
Pfalz C.I Production by Pfalz, with ailerons on all four wings: 300 built.
Rumpler C.IV (Pfal) The Pfalz C.I re-designated
Slingsby T.58 Rumpler C.IV replicaSlingsby Sailplanes built two Slingsby T.58 Rumpler C.IV replicas. While these were visually similar to the original aircraft, they were structurally completely different, having a steel-tube fuselage structure and wooden wings, and being powered by a de Havilland Gipsy Major engine
Rumpler 6B 2 floatplane fighter

Operators

SNETA (post-war)

Luftstreitkrafte
Kaiserliche Marine

Swiss Air Force

Ottoman Air Force

Yugoslav Royal Air Force - Postwar.

Specifications (C.IV)

See also

References

Notes

Bibliography
 Gray, Peter and Thetford, Owen. German Aircraft of the First World War. London, Putnam, 1962.

 Munson, Kenneth. Aircraft of World War I. London: Ian Allan, 1967. .
 Munson, Kenneth. Bombers, Patrol and Reconnaissance Aircraft 1914 - 1919. 
 Munson, Kenneth. Fighters, Attack and Training Aircraft 1914 - 1919. .

 Taylor, John W. R. Jane's All The World's Aircraft 1969–70. London: Sampson Low, Marston & Company, 1969. .

External links

A page about Max Psaar, an ethnic Sorbian Rumpler C.IV pilot of Luftstreitkräfte (in German).
Page on Rumpler C.IV on website Deutsches museum

1910s German military reconnaissance aircraft
Military aircraft of World War I
Biplanes
C.IV
Single-engined tractor aircraft
Aircraft first flown in 1917

de:Rumpler C.IV